Die Wannseekonferenz (en The Wannsee Conference) is a German TV docudrama, first aired January 24th 2022 by the ZDF broadcaster, about a conference held in Berlin-Wannsee in 1942 to organise the extermination of the Jews. Director Matti Geschonneck shows a  reenactment of the real Wannsee Conference held January 20, 1942, based on a script by Magnus Vattrodt. German Nazi officials meet midst the Second World War to determine the so-called "Final Solution to the Jewish Question". It is not the beginning of the Shoah but it is a meeting to coordinate various government branches for carrying out the destruction of Jews.

Cast

 Philipp Hochmair as Reinhard Heydrich, Chief of the Reich Security Main Office (RSHA)
 Johannes Allmayer	as Adolf Eichmann, Head of RSHA IV B4
 Sascha Nathan	as	Dr. Josef Bühler 
 Arnd Klawitter as Dr. Roland Freisler, for the Reich Ministry of Justice
 Markus Schleinzer	as	Otto Hofmann
 Fabian Busch as Dr. Gerhard Klopfer
 Thomas Loibl	as Friedrich Wilhelm Kritzinger
 Frederic Linkemann as Dr. Rudolf Lange
 Rafael Stachowiak	as Georg Leibbrandt
 Simon Schwarz	as	Martin Luther
 Peter Jordan	as	Dr. Alfred Meyer
 Jakob Diehl as Heinrich Müller, Chief of RSHA Department IV (the Gestapo)
 Matthias Bundschuh as Erich Neumann
 Maximilian Brückner as Dr. Eberhard Schöngarth
 Godehard Giese as Wilhelm Stuckart, for the Reich Ministry for the Interior
 Lilli Fichtner as Ingeburg Werlemann
 Frederik Schmid

Awards and Nominations 
BCN Film Fest 

 2022: "Best Movie Award“

Civis Media Prize 

 2022: "Entertainment“ (Civis Video Award)

Deutscher Fernsehpreis

 2022: "Best Movie Made for Television“
 2022: "Best Writing Fiction“: Paul Mommertz and Magnus Vattrodt
 2022: "Best Actor": Philipp Hochmair (Nominee)
 2022: "Best Directing Fiction": Matti Geschonneck (Nominee)

New York Festivals TV & Film Awards

 2022: "Feature Films“ (Gold-Award)

Romy (TV award)

 2022: "Favorite Actor“: Philipp Hochmair (Reinhard Heydrich)
 2022: "Bester Movie TV/Stream“: Friederich Oetker and Reinhold Elschot
 2022: "Best Writing TV/Stream“: Magnus Vattrodt and Paul Mommertz
Prix Europa

2022: "Best European TV Movie“

Günter-Rohrbach-Filmpreis 

2022: "Best Movie“

Fernsehfilmfestival Baden-Baden

2022: "3sat-Publikumspreis“

See also 
 Heinz Schirk (director): The Wannsee Conference, a 1984 German TV film
Conspiracy – a 2001 English language film
Fatherland – an alternate history novel dealing in large part with the Wannsee Conference - 1992
List of Holocaust films

References

External links 
 Die Wannseekonferenz Press release in the Press portal of the ZDF
 Die Wannseekonferenz (2022, en The Wannsee Conference)
 
 
 Catalogue, exhibition - The Meeting at Wannsee and the Murder of the European Jews

2022 films
2022 television films
Holocaust films
Films about Nazi Germany
Films set in Berlin
Films set in 1942